Barnard Castle was a county constituency centred on the town of Barnard Castle in County Durham, which returned one Member of Parliament (MP)  to the House of Commons of the Parliament of the United Kingdom.  It was created for the 1885 general election and abolished for the 1950 general election.

Boundaries

1885–1918 

 The Sessional Divisions of Barnard Castle and Staindrop, Stanhope (except the parishes of Hunstanworth and Edmondbyers) and Wolsingham, and part of the Sessional Division of Bishop Auckland.

The constituency was created for the 1885 general election by the Redistribution of Seats Act 1885 as one of eight new single-member divisions of the county of Durham, replacing the two 2-member seats of North Durham and South Durham. See map on Vision of Britain website.

The seat was located in the west of County Durham, in North East England. To the north of the constituency (moving from west to east) were the Northumberland division of Hexham and then North West Durham. To the east (moving from north to south) were Mid Durham, Bishop Auckland and South East Durham. To the south was Richmond (Yorks). To the west of the constituency (moving from south to north) were the Westmorland divisions of Appleby and Kendal.

1918–1950 

 The Urban Districts of Barnard Castle and Stanhope;
 the Rural Districts of Barnard Castle and Weardale; and
 parts of the Rural Districts of Auckland and Lanchester.

The constituency was expanded northwards, absorbing the western part of the abolished North West Durham seat (Lanchester). Crook and Tow Law were added to the new constituency of Spennymoor and a small area in the east was transferred to Bishop Auckland.

Abolition 
In 1950 the Barnard Castle urban and rural districts were included in the Bishop Auckland constituency. Other parts of the former constituency returned to the re-established North West Durham seat.

Members of Parliament

Election results

Elections in the 1880s

Elections in the 1890s

Elections in the 1900s

Elections in the 1910s

Elections in the 1920s

Elections in the 1930s

Election in the 1940s

See also

 History of parliamentary constituencies and boundaries in Durham

References

 Boundaries of Parliamentary Constituencies 1885-1972, compiled and edited by F.W.S. Craig (Parliamentary Reference Publications 1972)

Notes

Sources 
 
 

Parliamentary constituencies in County Durham (historic)
Constituencies of the Parliament of the United Kingdom established in 1885
Constituencies of the Parliament of the United Kingdom disestablished in 1950
Barnard Castle